Tosmurlu is a village in Silifke district of Mersin Province, Turkey.
The population of Tosmurlu  is 1072  as of 2011. According to the village web page the village was founded by the Yörüks (once nomadic Turkmans) about two centuries ago. The village economy depends on cereal agriculture. Sesame, olive, figs, grapes and honey locust are among the other crops. Some village residents work in various services in nearby Silifke.

References

External links 

Images

Villages in Silifke District